Mo Ali is a Somali-British film director.

Biography

Ali was born in Saudi Arabia.

He began his movie career in 2010, making his directorial debut in the drama film Shank, set in a futuristic London.

Ali is sometimes confused with the other Mo Ali, a writer and artist featured among the cast of Lint the Movie, a 2011 documentary on the cult science fiction author and philosopher Jeff Lint.

Filmography
Shank (2010)
Montana (2014)

See also
Cinema of Somalia

References

External links
 

Somalian film directors
English people of Somali descent
Living people
Saudi Arabian people of Somali descent
Saudi Arabian emigrants to the United Kingdom
Year of birth missing (living people)